A body camera, bodycam, body worn video (BWV), body-worn camera, or wearable camera is a wearable audio, video, or photographic recording system.

Body cameras have a range of uses and designs, of which the best-known use is as a part of policing equipment. Other uses include action cameras for social and recreational (including cycling), within the world of  commerce, in healthcare and medical use, in military use, journalism, citizen sousveillance and covert surveillance.

Research on the impact of body-worn cameras in law enforcement shows mixed evidence as to the impact of cameras on the use of force by law enforcement and communities' trust in police.

Designs 
Body-worn cameras are often designed to be worn in one of three locations: on the torso, on or built into a helmet, and on or built into glasses. Some feature live streaming capabilities, such as GPS positioning, automatic offload to cloud storage, while others are based on local storage. Some body-worn cameras offer automatic activation of the cameras with the ability to adhere to that agency's specific body camera recording policies.  The National Criminal Justice Technology Research, Test, and Evaluation Center has conducted market surveys on body-worn cameras to assist organizations in purchasing the best camera. The survey discusses device functionality, optics, audio, GPS, and several more categories. These cameras range in price from 200 dollars to 2,000 dollars.

Applications

Law enforcement

Wearable cameras are used by police and other law enforcement organizations in countries around the world. The cameras are intended to improve interactions between officers and the public. The first generation of 'modern' police body cameras was introduced around 2005 in the United Kingdom, followed from 2014 onwards by large-scale implementation in the United States, mainly to increase transparency and police accountability. Early studies showed positive results, but replications have led to mixed findings. Outcomes have been shown to differ depending on the local context and the guidelines regulating activation of the body cams. Challenges include training, privacy, storage and the use of recordings further 'downstream' in the judicial system. A systematic review assessed the available evidence on the effect of body-worn cameras in law enforcement on police and citizen behavior. They found that body-worn cameras may not substantially impact officer or citizen behavior and that effects on use of force and arrest activities are inconsistent and non-significant. Research suggests no clear effects of body-worn cameras in terms of citizen behavior such as calls to police and resisting arrest. Subsequent analysis of the research affirms these mixed findings and draws attention to how the design of many evaluations fails to account for local context or citizen perspectives. 

Body- worn cameras have become one of the biggest costs for townships, cities, and agencies for police, costing millions of dollars. The main reason for the growth of body-worn cameras is a direct result of the publicizing of events over the past decade, where Caucasian police offers have killed unarmed Black civilians. The main place where body- worn cameras have become more popular, is in low-researched environments, because the main driving reason for BWC becoming so popular was due to public protest. 

Body worn cameras by police, was not only a popular development in the United States, but also by those in England and Wales, and there, it's not a new discovery. The overall outcome and reactions to these cameras have been positive, but there has been no proof of how these BWC have had impacts on the actions and reactions of the police wearing them.

Firefighting 

Firefighters use helmet cameras as a tool to assess fires and for communication and training purposes. Cameras in this occupation are often thermal cameras in order to be able to see in darkness and inside smoke-filled buildings. Augmented reality (AR) can be added to accentuate outlines of objects and people.

Healthcare 
Body worn video has been suggested and explored in the medical field. Data recorded from wearable cameras can assist in medical research and limit error caused by inaccurate self-reporting of data. It is speculated that under-reporting is common when conducting dietary and nutrition assessments. Research suggests body worn video reduces under-reporting of intake during such assessments. Cameras can [removed the words for example] be used as a memory prosthetic for conditions that affect the memory. In 2013, Google Glass was used to assist in surgery by providing a mostly hands-free way to broadcast and receive consultation from another surgeon. Body cameras were provided to hospital staff by the Cardiff and Vale Health Board in Wales, United Kingdom. The cameras were issued to reduce the likelihood of violent assaults against staff. According to the manager who provides support to staff who have been attacked, the cameras – and especially the audio recording – have been vital for successful prosecutions.

Body cameras can be used to make in impact in the mental health world. While there is only currently minimal evidence on the effects that body cameras have in a mental health setting in reference to violence within patience, the technology points towards lower numbers of complaints from the public that are happening, although the exact evidence isn't crystal clear.

Military combat

Body worn cameras, as well as helmet cameras are used in the military. Video can either be stored locally, or streamed back to a command center or military outpost. A notable instance of this was the raid on Osama Bin Laden's compound, where live video footage of the raid is believed to have been streamed to the White House. In 2013, Royal Marine Alexander Blackman was convicted of murder for killing a captive Taliban insurgent; footage from incident, recorded on a helmet camera, was used in Blackman's court-martial. The conviction was overturned in 2017 and reduced to manslaughter on the grounds of diminished responsibility with Blackman being released from jail.  The helmet camera has been the focus of the Discovery Channel series Taking Fire about the 101st Airborne in the Korengal documenting their personal war footage. In 2016 "a camera recovered from the helmet of a dead fighter offers a contrasting picture of chaos and panic in a battle with Kurdish peshmerga."

Retail 
Body cameras may be worn by retail workers to deter against abusive or threatening behavior by customers.

Retail workers are looking for ways to solve issues when it comes to dealing with criminal behavior, while also making the staff feel safer and more comfortable when working.

Body cameras have become part of police officers' everyday uniforms, by police in the United States. They have been initiated to help with regulating and enforcing laws in their everyday work, by recording while they are on their shift.

Privacy concerns 
Concerns over privacy have been raised with this technology, most notably in the context of Google Glasses and policing. The advent of large-scale data collection, possibly in combination with facial recognition and other technologies capable of interpreting videos in bulk, means that all cameras, including body worn cameras, could create a means of tracking people anywhere they go. In policing, critics have warned that each police officer could become a "roving surveillance camera" Issues involving privacy concerns continue as new technologies are presented to law enforcement but the government has had ways of masking the technologies from the public and in some cases, even the police. Police will interact with citizens during vulnerable moments, such as in a hospital, or in a domestic violence situation. Concerns have also been raised that this algorithms not only infringe on privacy rights, but could also be ethnically biased. The American Civil Liberties Union,has suggested policies to balance citizen's rights with the desire for more transparency and accountability.

Discourse of police body cameras 

The discussion of police officer wearing body cameras has been a debate for years, as many police officers started wearing body cameras around 2014. Not everyone agrees with the use of body cameras but they have become beneficial in the case of collecting valuable information related to a crime being committed. At the same time, the privacy of citizens can be compromised by body cameras potentially exposing them to unwanted publicity. The accountability of police is increased as they use body cameras to ensure the protection of the public against police misconduct. A further discussion of police body cameras occurs because the improvements need to be done within the law enforcement system that requires police behavior to change. After that, new technologies can be implemented to help increase the accountability of police.

See also 
 Helmet camera
 Sousveillance
 Shooting of Jamarion Robinson
 Refcam

References

External links

 
 

Portable electronics
Video